Disneyland Hotel may refer to any of the following properties and/or licensees of The Walt Disney Company and The Oriental Land Company:

 Disneyland Hotel (California) 
 Disneyland Hotel (Paris) 
 Hong Kong Disneyland Hotel
 Shanghai Disneyland Hotel
 Tokyo Disneyland Hotel

See also
:Category:Hotels in Disney resorts